The Grand Alliance Party is a political party in Sierra Leone.

At the last elections, 14 May 2002, the party won 2.4% of popular votes and no seats.

Sierra Leone’s Political Parties Registration Commission (PPRC) listed 31 registered political parties in a 2011 report. But of those on the PPRC’s list, 27 can be identified as either dormant or inactive despite having existed in name since 1996. Some appear during elections and disappear immediately after the polls. Thirteen parties contested in 1996. Three years on, five smaller parties merged to form the Grand Alliance Party (GAP), reducing the number of parties to nine in the 2002 electoral contest. After GAP went dormant, just eight parties contested the 2007 election.

References

Political parties in Sierra Leone